There Goes the Bride is a 1980 British comedy film directed by Terry Marcel and starring Tom Smothers, Twiggy, Phil Silvers, Broderick Crawford, Sylvia Syms and Martin Balsam. It is based upon the 1973 play of the same name written by John Chapman and Ray Cooney.

Plot
Adman Timothy Westerby (Smothers) throws his daughter's wedding day into chaos when he repeatedly hallucinates that he is seeing his "dream girl" (Twiggy), and refuses to leave her side.

On the rare occasions Westerby is coherent, the distraught bride (Fuller) has locked herself in her room, further delaying things.

Since Westerby is the only one who can see his "dreamgirl", this creates confusion with his wife (Sims) and father-in-law-to-be (Balsam), the latter of whom is a hot-tempered Texan prone to gun-toting tantrums.

Also, an important client (Backus) is expecting a new ad slogan for an important account starting yesterday, but Westerby is in no condition to deliver it.

The events of the film are dictated to a psychiatrist (Silvers) by a distraught patient (Stark), who was the wedding caterer and bewildered witness.

Cast
Tom Smothers – Timothy Westerby 
Twiggy – Polly Perkins 
Martin Balsam – Elmer Babcock 
Sylvia Syms – Ursula Westerby 
Michael Witney – Bill Shorter 
Phil Silvers – Psychiatrist 
Broderick Crawford – Petrol station attendant 
Jim Backus – Mr Perkins 
Hermione Baddeley – Daphne Drimond 
Graham Stark – Bernardo Rossi 
Geoffrey Sumner – Gerald Drimond 
Toria Fuller – Judy Westerby 
John Terry – Nicholas Babcock 
Pedro Gonzalez Gonzalez – Mr Ramirez
Steve Franken – Church organist

References

External links

1980 films
1980 comedy films
Films based on works by Ray Cooney
Films directed by Terry Marcel
Films shot at Pinewood Studios
British comedy films
1980s English-language films
1980s British films